Dewi Nantbrân (real name David or Dewi Powell; died 1781) was a Welsh Friar Minor.  He wrote the "Catechism Byrr o'r Athrawiaeth Ghristnogol" (London, 1764), a short catechism of Christian doctrine in the Welsh language.

Powell, who came from Abergavenny, was described by Meic Stephens as the most notable Catholic writer of his century for his three Welsh-language books.

References

1781 deaths
Date of birth unknown
Welsh Friars Minor
Welsh-language writers
18th-century Welsh writers
18th-century British male writers